The Canadian Academy of Sport and Exercise Medicine (CASEM) is the national medical specialty society for sport medicine physicians in Canada. The Academy is open for membership to medical doctors (MD) within Canada and internationally. Founded in 1970, the Academy serves as a means to ensure its members are kept up to date with current medical practices in sport medicine. The Diploma of Sport and Exercise Medicine (DipSportMed) developed by CASEM, is a recognized credential for sport medicine physicians in Canada. The Clinical Journal of Sport Medicine, founded by CASEM, is a peer reviewed sport medicine journal, now published by Lippincott Williams & Wilkins.

References

External links
 Canadian Academy of Sport and Exercise Medicine
 Clinical Journal of Sport Medicine

Medical associations based in Canada
Sports medicine organizations
Sports professional associations
Sports organizations of Canada
Sports organizations established in 1970